In 19th-century psychiatry, monomania (from Greek , one, and , meaning "madness" or "frenzy") was a form of partial insanity conceived as single psychological obsession in an otherwise sound mind.

Types
Monomania may refer to:

 De Clerambault's syndrome (erotomania): Delusion that a particular man or woman is in love with the patient. This can occur without reinforcement or even acquaintanceship with the love object.
 Idée fixe: Domination by an overvalued idea, for example, "staying thin" in anorexia nervosa
 Kleptomania: Irresistible urge to steal
 Pyromania: Impulse to deliberately start fires
 Lypemania: Early elaboration later to become modern concept of depression
 Narcissism: Pursuit of gratification from one's own attributes

History 
Partial insanity, variations of which enjoyed a long pre-history in jurisprudence, was in contrast to the traditional notion of total insanity, exemplified in the diagnosis of mania, as a global condition affecting all aspects of understanding and which reflected the position that the mind or soul was an indivisible entity. Coined by the French psychiatrist Jean-Étienne Dominique Esquirol (1772–1840) around 1810, monomania was a new disease-concept characterised by the presence of an expansive fixed-idea in which the mind was diseased and deranged in some facets but otherwise normal in others. Esquirol and his circle described three broad categories of monomania consistent with their traditional three-part classification of the mind into intellectual, emotional and volitional faculties. Emotional monomania is that in which the patient is obsessed with only one emotion or several related to it; intellectual monomania is that which is related to only one kind of delirious idea or ideas. Although monomania was retained as one of seven recognized categories of mental illness in the 1880 US census, its importance as a psychiatric diagnostic category was in decline from the mid-19th century.

See also 

 Autism
 Addictive behaviour
 Idée fixe (psychology)
 Obsessive Compulsive Disorder
 Moral insanity

References

External links 
 

Obsolete terms for mental disorders
Mania